The seventh season of Law & Order: Criminal Intent premiered  on USA Network on October 4, 2007, and ended on August 24, 2008. 

The first ten episodes of the seventh season aired on Thursday nights at 10:00PM/9:00PM (Central), filling a slot previously occupied by the first season of Burn Notice. The season then took a "fall finale" with the episode "Senseless," coinciding with the 2007 Writers Guild of America strike where show runner/executive producer Warren Leight and the rest of the writing staff participated in the work stoppage; the first ten episodes of the season being the only ones produced. The remaining twelve episodes resumed airing Sunday nights at 9:00PM/8:00PM (Central) – leading in new series In Plain Sight – starting June 8, 2008.

Network change and production
During the 2006-2007 network TV season, both Law & Order: Criminal Intent and the original Law & Order series began to falter in the ratings on NBC; president at the time Jeff Zucker was in a telephone interview with creator Dick Wolf when he renewed both series, Mr. Zucker said the plan to move original episodes of Criminal Intent to USA Network, with the repeats then set to play "shortly thereafter" on NBC, represented "a new paradigm for network TV." Wolf said he was thrilled with the deal because "my stated goal has been to keep all three shows (L&O, CI, & SVU) up and running." Both the original series and Criminal Intent won full 22-episode orders, although most series for cable channels do not produce more than 13. Mr. Wolf said that he had found some budgetary savings to make the deal more viable, but that "none of them are going to be apparent to viewers."

Chris Noth who portrayed Detective Mike Logan said on the move from network to cable; "Cable is probably the future. They're paying a lot more attention to [the show] than NBC did, frankly." Noth also believed the change would help the series differentiate itself from the rest of the franchise, saying, "We're happy to set ourselves apart." Vincent D'Onofrio who portrayed Detective Robert Goren said about the switch, "I feel like it saved the show." In an interview about his character, Eric Bogosian (who portrayed Captain Daniel Ross) thought about the move to USA, "We were one of whatever number of shows on NBC, we're getting numbers every week, we're knocking ourselves out to do the best we can, and I don't think we had one ad all season. To be on USA and have them embrace us and cheerlead us, we feel we deserve it. USA wants us to succeed. I just hope more people watch it and dig it."

The theme music changed to that of the then-defunct Law & Order: Trial by Jury. Original episodes of season seven aired on USA Network until August 2008, with reruns on NBC beginning in January 2008. Production of the seventh season was interrupted by the 2007 Writers Guild of America strike when Executive Producer Warren Leight and the rest of the writing staff participated in the work stoppage. Only 10 of the 22 episodes ordered were produced pre-strike, while the remaining 12 episodes began airing June 8, 2008.

In May 2008, before the remaining episodes returned, USA Network decided to renew Criminal Intent for a sixteen-episode eighth season. Days after USA Network renewed the series, executive producer Warren Leight announced that he was departing the series, after having taken CI to the top drama series in basic cable primetime for the fourth quarter, more than doubling USA’s audience in the 10 p.m. Thursday slot from the same period the previous year. Leight departed at the end of the season to work on HBO's therapy drama, In Treatment.

Cast changes
While Criminal Intent was in transition from NBC to USA Network, the salaries of cast members Vincent D'Onofrio, Kathryn Erbe, and Chris Noth were frozen. The prospect of the salary freeze wasn't sitting well with them, as they typically enjoy at least a five percent year-to-year bump. In the end they accepted a non-pay raise for the new season and they returned, static at $350K for each of the 11 episodes produced.

Julianne Nicholson was temporarily replaced by Alicia Witt who played Detective Nola Falacci, a new partner to Detective Logan, while Nicholson was on maternity leave. Nicholson returned in the episode "Contract," which aired on June 15, 2008 (with In Plain Sight's Mary McCormack making a cameo as her character Mary Shannon).

Chris Noth decided to leave the series at the end of the season; Noth told TV Guide, "When others couldn't get television shows produced in New York, Dick Wolf found a way to do it, and as a New Yorker I truly appreciate all that he has done for the city. The last few years have been fantastic, and both sides are happy with the result. 'All's well that ends well.'" Noth said the split was "totally mutual." He added, "The show keeps morphing and always finds new people. I'm gonna miss everyone I work with every day." Creator Dick Wolf said about Noth's departure "Chris has been a member of the "Law & Order" family since the beginning, and Mike Logan is one of the most popular detectives in the history of television," Wolf says. "We all wish him the best."

Jeff Goldblum was set to replace Noth. "Jeff's presence will add a new dimension to an already successful show," Dick Wolf said in a statement.

Cast

Primary cast

Recurring cast
 Leslie Hendrix as Chief Medical Examiner Elizabeth Rodgers
 Tony Goldwyn as Frank Goren
 Geneva Carr as News Reporter Faith Yancy
 Seth Gilliam as Detective Daniels
Mike Pniewski as Chief of Detectives Kenneth Moran
 Holt McCallany as Detective Patrick Copa
 Leslie Hope as Assistant District Attorney Terri Driver

Guest stars
Holt McCallany guest starred in the season premiere episode "Amends," as Detective Patrick Copa, a cop with visual problems who witnesses his partner Kevin Quinn (Gerald McCullouch) getting killed in their unmarked car. Copa returned in the teaser of the episode "Purgatory," where he gets into an altercation with Goren in a local bar, because Goren wound up having Copa forced into early retirement due to his vision problems. Seth Gilliam guest starred in the season premiere and in episodes "Senseless" and "Purgatory" as Detective Daniels, a detective from narcotics who helped work cases in Major Case where drugs and gangs were believed to be involved. Daniels is Eames' partner temporarily while Goren is under suspension and undercover. Michael O'Keefe guest starred in "Seeds" as Doctor Eli Rush in a case where an OB-GYN is murdered and posed in a ritualistic fashion.

Amy Acker guest starred in "Smile" as Leslie LeZard, an employee in a company that appears to have been the victim of a criminal conspiracy involving contaminated mouthwash. Lola Glaudini portrayed Leanne Baker, a double-crossing defense attorney who almost gets away with double murders. Frederick Weller guest starred as Simon Harper, a wealthy man who kills members of a treasure hunting trio of con artists that were working for him. Kelli Giddish played Dana Stipe, a woman who was initially believed to have killed one of her partners. Steve Guttenberg and Paula Devicq guest star in "Courtship" as a famous couple, Clay Darren and Christine Mayfield, in the middle of a divorce after both bribing and harassing a judge (Bruce MacVittie) in their own ways, Mayfield killing the judge's wife just to be with him. Peter Coyote guest starred in "Self-Made" as Lionel Shill, a celebrated writer whose career is on the decline, as well as his young protégé T.J. Hawkins (Pablo Schreiber). 

Cynthia Watros guest starred as Beth Hoyle, the spouse of an ambitious Bronx assistant district attorney (Andrew McCarthy), who is seeking a rape case against a group of college football players. In "Untethered," Tony Goldwyn returned as Frank Goren, Detective Goren's brother, who is off the streets and has cleaned himself up; his nephew Donny Carlson (Trevor Morgan) is in prison and he suspects foul play in an inmate’s death, due to a warden (Debra Monk) who takes her prisoners to isolation and allows them to be killed. Jesse Garcia guest starred as Felix Aguilar in the episode "Senseless." Aguilar killed three black teenagers because he thought they thought they were "better than him."

In the episode "Purgatory," Dean Winters and Lauren Vélez guest star as Mike Stoat and Lois Melago, a duo of dirty cops.  Det. Robert Goren is the other partner of this duo as he goes undercover to take down a high-level drug-dealer named John Testarossa (Danny Mastrogiorgio) in order to prove himself while he is under suspension pending a psychiatric evaluation. When Law & Order: Criminal Intent returned from the Writer's Guild strike on 8 June 2008, it was the lead-in to the premiere of new series In Plain Sight – that series' star, Mary McCormack, appeared in her role as U.S. Marshal Mary Shannon in "Contract," on 15 June 2008. In the episode "Betrayed", Brenda Strong portrayed Kathy Jarrow, a woman who becomes a suspect in the disappearance of her husband and his lover. She gets close to old friend Captain Ross, hoping to keep him and the detectives from solving the case; Senator Charles E. Schumer also makes a cameo appearance in the episode. In "Assassin," Indira Varma plays Bela Kahn, a Tamilian freedom fighter and political activist who survives an assassination attempt at JFK when she returns from her house arrest in Sri Lanka.

Sarah Jane Morris guest starred in "Please Note We Are No Longer Accepting Letters of Recommendation from Henry Kissinger" as Marla Reynolds, a woman who murders the parents of three children who are on an exclusive and long waiting list to get into a Day Care Center. Jessica Walter portrayed her wealthy, ambitious, and vindictive mother-in-law Eleanor. In "Reunion," Michael Massee plays a rock-star accused of murder named Jordie Black. Noel Fisher guest stars in the episode as Milo Rhodes-Black, the son of a murdered talk-show host. James Frain and Christopher Lloyd guest star in "Vanishing Act" as magicians accused of murdering another magician. Miguel Ferrer guest starred in "Ten Count" as boxing coach Gus Kovak, who coached Gabriel and Peter Gardela (Enver Gjokaj). Detective Logan was Peter's mentor, and Logan kept him out of trouble and showed him how to control his impulses. 

Leslie Hope guest starred in "Neighborhood Watch" and "Last Rites" as Assistant District Attorney Terri Driver, an ambitious prosecutor who pushed a girl to lie and say she was raped to put an innocent boy in prison, who was later killed. Logan and Driver immediately begin knocking heads. Logan jeopardizes both his and Wheeler's careers when a priest convinces him to reopen a 16-year-old homicide case which involves Driver, who will stop at nothing to keep the truth buried. Logan goes to war with her, as she is planning to run for Attorney General, when Logan discovers that she may have prosecuted the wrong person for her own personal gain. Also in the episode "Last Rites", 
Denis O'Hare plays Father Chris Shea, a priest who sends Logan to reopen a case he worked with former partner Lennie Bricoe, Chris McKinney also plays Randy Nichols, an African-American trafficker who is indicted and prosecuted by Driver. In "Frame," John Glover returns as Dr. Declan Gage; he manipulates Nicole Wallace (Olivia d'Abo) into killing Detective Goren's brother (Tony Goldwyn), then Gage kills her as well.

Episodes

{| class="wikitable plainrowheaders" style="width:100%"
|- style="color:white"
! style="background:#911d1d;"|No. inseries
! style="background:#911d1d;"|No. inseason
! style="background:#911d1d;"|Title
! style="background:#911d1d;"|Directed by
! style="background:#911d1d;"|Written by
! style="background:#911d1d; width:135px"| air date
! style="background:#911d1d; width:135px"|NBC air date
! style="background:#911d1d;"|
! style="background:#911d1d;"|U.S. viewers(millions)

|}

References

 

 

Law & Order: Criminal Intent episodes
2007 American television seasons
2008 American television seasons